Mysteries at the National Parks is an American reality television series that premiered on May 1, 2015, on the Travel Channel. The series features the secrets and legends in National Parks across the United States. Episodes air on Fridays at 9:00 p.m. EST.

Premise
Each half-hour episode includes interviews with historians, scientists, authors, and paranormal investigators, as well as dramatic recreations featuring actors re-telling haunting stories of the unexplained, mysteries and legends from the most famous of America's national parks.

Episodes

Reception
The series has garnered mixed reviews. Tom Conroy of Media Life Magazine says, "Mysteries at the National Parks, dumb. Travel Channel series may set a new low in junk television". Conversely, Doug Knoop of The Seattle Times says, "Mysteries at the National Parks is a TV pick for Friday."

See also
List of national parks of the United States

References

External links
Official website - Mysteries at the National Parks

2015 American television series debuts
2010s American documentary television series
Travel Channel original programming
Television series featuring reenactments
2015 American television series endings